Silverton High School is a public high school located in the rural town of Silverton, Oregon, United States. It is a part of the Silver Falls School District, and is the only high school in the district.

Campus

Silverton High School, until recently, was divided between two campuses, the older Schlador Street campus, and the newer Pine Street campus. In 1994, voters passed the bond levy for construction of the first phase of a two phase project to build a new high school building. The new high school campus was constructed on Pine Street in Silverton, and was completed in 2002 with the capacity to hold approximately 500 students. However, the initial bond levy for the second phase failed, leaving the Silverton High School divided between its two campuses. As of the fall of 2002, roughly 350 freshmen were attending the Pine Street campus, and were routinely bussed to the old campus for higher level classes. Finally, in November 2006, a new bond levy was passed and the second phase of the high school construction was slated to begin. Construction was finished in August 2009. The Pine Street campus was opened on September 9, 2009; all four grades were joined in the same building for the first time in 12 years.

Academics
In 2008, 83% of the school's seniors received a high school diploma. Of 291 students, 241 graduated, 37 dropped out, four received a modified diploma, and nine were still in high school the following year.

Notable alumni
 Scott Gragg, 1990, football player
 Howard Hesseman, actor
 Don Pettit, 1973, astronaut
 Henk Schenk, 1963, former wrestler

References

External links
 Silverton High School website

Silverton, Oregon
High schools in Marion County, Oregon
Public high schools in Oregon